Toby C Thatcher (born 28 January 1989) is an Australian-British conductor.

Thatcher is Artistic Director of the Nineteenth Circle, a group of 19th Century-specialist performers committed to diversifying the voice within classical music programming, and representing a fuller spectrum of coetaneous human experience in order to enhance the canon", and Founder & Director of Zeitgeist, an online multimedia gallery & commissioner of contemporary work.

Thatcher is Assistant Conductor to the Orchestre National de France.

Between April 2015 and December 2017, he was Assistant Conductor of the Sydney Symphony Orchestra. In 2019 Thatcher won second prize at the International Competition of Young Conductors Lovro von Matačić. In 2015, he won third prize at the Sir Georg Solti International Conductors' Competition (see Georg Solti) for conducting Strauss's Don Juan and Dvořák's Carnival Overture in front of the hr-Sinfonieorchester and Frankfurter Opern- und Museumsorchester. In August 2015, Thatcher was joint winner of the inaugural Neeme Järvi Prize at the Menuhin Festival. Thatcher has worked with various international ensembles, including the Sydney Symphony Orchestra, the Adelaide Symphony Orchestra, Sinfonieorchester Basel and Ensemble Modern.

Thatcher holds several awards in his birth country, including the Brian Stacey Award for Young Australian Conductors, and the 2016 Award for Outstanding Achievement from the University of Sydney.

In 2014, Thatcher graduated from the Royal Academy of Music with an MA, where he studied as an oboist. During his studies, Thatcher played with orchestras such as the Philharmonia Orchestra, the Royal Philharmonic Orchestra, the London Sinfonietta, the Australian Youth Orchestra and The Sydney Youth Orchestra.

References

External links 

1989 births
Alumni of the Royal Academy of Music
Australian conductors (music)
Living people
21st-century conductors (music)